Perumbaikad is a census town in Kottayam district in the Indian state of Kerala.

Demographics
 India census, Perumbaikad had a population of 42,984. Males constitute 49% of the population and females 51%. Perumbaikad has an average literacy rate of 86%, higher than the national average of 59.5%: male literacy is 87%, and female literacy is 86%. In Perumbaikad, 11% of the population is under 6 years of age.

References

Villages in Kottayam district